Burçak is a common unisex Turkish given name. In Turkish, "Burçak" means "Vicia".

People
 Burçak Çerezcioğlu, main character of Turkish novel "Mavi Saçlı Kız" which was authored by her father after her death.
 Burçak Ertimur, a Turkish scientist and Marketing researcher. She is currently working in Fairleigh Dickinson University.
 Burçak Evren, a Turkish film historian.
 Burçak Eyuboğlu, a Turkish educationist and -together with her husband- co-founder of Eyüboğlu High School.
 Burçak Işımer, a Turkish actress appearing in Murat Aras's "En Son Babalar Duyar".
 Burçak Orçun, a Turkish news presenter. She is currently anchor woman of Bloomberg's Turkey frenchise Habertürk TV.
 Burçak Özoğlu Poçan, a Turkish mountain climber.
 Ceren Burçak Dağ, a Turkish inventor. She received Stockholm Junior Water Prize in 2009.

Fictional characters
 Burçak, one of the main characters of "Senin Uğruna", performed by Özge Ulusoy.

Turkish feminine given names
Turkish unisex given names
Turkish-language surnames